Espresso is a coffee-brewing method of Italian origin, in which a small amount of nearly boiling water (about ) is forced under  of pressure through finely-ground coffee beans. Espresso can be made with a wide variety of coffee beans and roast degrees. Espresso is the most common way of making coffee in southern Europe, especially in Italy, France, Spain, and Portugal. It is also popular in Switzerland, Croatia, Bosnia and Herzegovina, Bulgaria, Greece, South Africa, the United Kingdom, the United States, Canada, Chile, Brazil, Australia and New Zealand.

Espresso is generally thicker than coffee brewed by other methods, with a viscosity similar to that of warm honey. This is due to the higher concentration of suspended and dissolved solids, and the crema on top (a foam with a creamy consistency). As a result of the pressurized brewing process, the flavors and chemicals in a typical cup of espresso are very concentrated. Espresso has more caffeine per unit volume than most coffee beverages, but because its usual serving size is much smaller than (for example) drip-brewed coffee, the caffeine content of a single serving of espresso is generally lower than that of a mug of drip coffee. The actual caffeine content of any coffee drink varies by size, bean origin, roast method and other factors, but a typical  serving of espresso usually contains 64.5 milligrams of caffeine, whereas a typical (8 ounce) serving of drip coffee usually contains 150 to 200 mg.

The three dispersed phases in espresso are what make this beverage unique. The first dispersed phase is an emulsion of oil droplets. The second phase is suspended solids, while the third is the layer of gas bubbles or foam. The dispersion of very small oil droplets is perceived in the mouth as creamy. This characteristic of espresso contributes to what is known as the body of the beverage. These oil droplets preserve some of the aromatic compounds that are lost to the air in other coffee forms, enhancing the strong flavor of espresso.

Espresso is served on its own, and is also used as the base for various other coffee drinks, including caffè latte, cappuccino, caffè macchiato, caffè mocha, flat white, and caffè Americano.

Brewing

Espresso is made by forcing very hot water under high pressure through finely ground compacted coffee. There is no universal standard defining the process of extracting espresso, but several published definitions attempt to constrain the amount and type of ground coffee used, the temperature and pressure of the water, and the rate of extraction. Generally, one uses an espresso machine to make espresso.

The act of producing a shot of espresso is often called "pulling" a shot, originating from lever espresso machines, with which a barista pulls down a handle attached to a spring-loaded piston, which forces hot water through the coffee at high pressure. However, it is more common for an electric pump to generate the pressure.

Tamping down the coffee promotes the water's even penetration through the grounds. This process produces a thicker beverage by extracting both solid and dissolved components.

The "crema" is a layer of dense foam that forms on top of the drink. It consists of emulsified oils in the ground coffee turned into a colloid, which does not occur in other brewing methods. Crema is produced when water, placed under very high pressure, dissolves more carbon dioxide, a gas present inside the coffee that is produced during the roasting process.

The technical parameters outlined by the Italian Espresso National Institute for making a "certified Italian espresso" are:

Espresso roast 

Espresso is both a coffee beverage and a brewing method. It is not a specific bean, bean blend, or roast level. Any bean or roasting level can be used to produce authentic espresso. For example, in southern Italy, a darker roast is generally preferred. Farther north, the trend moves toward slightly lighter roasts, while outside Italy a wide range is popular.

History

Angelo Moriondo, from Turin, is often erroneously credited for inventing the beverage, since he patented a steam-driven coffee beverage making device in 1884 (No. 33/256), probably the first Italian coffee machine similar to other French and English 1800s steam-driven coffee machines. The device is "almost certainly the first Italian bar machine that controlled the supply of steam and water separately through the coffee" and Moriondo is "certainly one of the earliest discoverers of the expresso  machine, if not the earliest". Seventeen years later, in 1901, Luigi Bezzera, from Milan, devised and patented several improved versions of the espresso machine, the first of which was applied for on 19 December 1901. Titled "Innovations in the machinery to prepare and immediately serve coffee beverage"; Patent No. 153/94, 61707, was granted on 5 June 1902, and was the first espresso machine. In 1903, the patent was bought by Desiderio Pavoni, who founded the La Pavoni company and began to produce the machine industrially, manufacturing one machine daily in a small workshop in Via Parini, Milan.

In Italy, the rise of espresso consumption was associated with industrialization and urbanization, notably in Turin, Genoa, and Milan in northwest Italy.
Italians also spread espresso culture into their East African colonies, Italian Somalia and Italian Eritrea. Under the Fascist regime, coffee consumed standing up was subject to price controls, encouraging the "stand at a bar" culture.

In the English-speaking world, espresso became popular, particularly in the form of cappuccino, owing to the tradition of drinking coffee with milk and the exotic appeal of the foam; in the United States, this was more often in the form of lattes, with or without flavored syrups added. The latte is claimed to have been invented in the 1950s by Italian American Lino Meiorin of Caffe Mediterraneum in Berkeley, California, as a long cappuccino, and was then popularized in Seattle, and then nationally and internationally by Seattle-based Starbucks in the late 1980s and 1990s.

In the United Kingdom, espresso grew in popularity among youth in the 1950s, who felt more welcome in the coffee shops than in pubs. Espresso was initially popular, particularly within the Italian diaspora, growing in popularity with tourism to Italy exposing others to espresso, as developed by Eiscafès established by Italians in Germany. Initially, expatriate Italian espresso bars were seen as downmarket venues, serving the working-class Italian diaspora and thus providing appeal to the alternative subculture; this can still be seen in the United States in Italian American neighborhoods, such as Boston's North End, New York's Little Italy, and San Francisco's North Beach. As specialty coffee developed in the 1980s (following earlier developments in the 1970s and even 1960s), an indigenous artisanal coffee culture developed, with espresso instead positioned as an upmarket drink.

In the 2010s, coffee culture commentators distinguish large-chain mid-market coffee as "Second Wave Coffee", and upmarket artisanal coffee as "Third Wave Coffee". In the Middle East and Asia, espresso is growing in popularity, with the opening of Western coffee-shop chains.

Trieste is the seat of the Universita del Caffe, founded by Illy in 1999. This center of excellence was created to spread the quality coffee culture through training across the world, educate barista, and conduct research and innovation. Particular attention is paid to the preparation of the espresso and the relevant scientific research. It is also about the correct interaction of coffee and espresso machine.

Café vs. home preparation

Home espresso machines have increased in popularity with the general rise of interest in espresso. Today, a wide range of home espresso equipment can be found in kitchen and appliance stores, online vendors, and department stores. The first espresso machine for home use was the Gaggia Gilda. Soon afterwards, similar machines such as the Faema Faemina, FE-AR La Peppina and VAM Caravel followed suit in similar form factor and operational principles. These machines still have a small but dedicated share of fans. Until the advent of the first small electrical pump-based espresso machines such as the Gaggia Baby and Quickmill 810, home espresso machines were not widely adopted. In recent years, the increased availability of convenient counter-top fully automatic home espresso makers and pod-based espresso serving systems has increased the quantity of espresso consumed at home. The popularity of home espresso making parallels the increase of home coffee roasting. Some amateurs pursue both home roasting coffee and making espresso.

Etymology and spelling

Some English dictionaries translate espresso as "pressed-out", but the word also conveys the senses of expressly for you and quickly:

Modern espresso, using hot water under pressure, as pioneered by Gaggia in the 1940s, was originally called crema caffè (in English, "cream coffee") as seen on old Gaggia machines, due to the crema. This term is no longer used, though crema caffè and variants (caffè crema, café crema) still appear in branding.

Variant spelling

The spelling expresso is mostly considered incorrect, though some sources call it a less common variant. It is common in French and Portuguese. Italy uses the term espresso, substituting s for most x letters in Latin-root words; x is not considered part of the standard Italian alphabet. Italian people commonly refer to it simply as caffè (coffee), espresso being the ordinary coffee to order; in Spain, while café expreso is seen as the more "formal" denomination, café solo (alone, without milk) is the usual way to ask for it when at an espresso bar.

Some sources state that expresso is an incorrect spelling, including Garner's Modern American Usage. While the 'expresso' spelling is recognized as mainstream usage in some American dictionaries, some cooking websites call the 'x' variant illegitimate. Oxford Dictionaries online states "The spelling "expresso" is not used in the original Italian and is strictly incorrect, although it is common." The Oxford English Dictionary and Merriam-Webster call it a variant spelling. The Online Etymology Dictionary calls "expresso" a variant of "espresso". The Oxford Dictionary of American Usage and Style (2000) describes the spelling expresso as "wrong", and specifies espresso as the only correct form. The third edition of Fowler's Modern English Usage, published by the Oxford University Press in 1996, noted that the form espresso "has entirely driven out the variant expresso (which was presumably invented under the impression that it meant 'fast, express')".

Shot variables 

The main variables in a shot of espresso are the "size" and "length". This terminology is standardized, but the precise sizes and proportions vary substantially.

Cafés may have a standardized shot (size and length), such as "triple ristretto", only varying the number of shots in espresso-based drinks such as lattes, but not changing the extraction – changing between a double and a triple requires changing the filter basket size, while changing between ristretto, normale, and lungo may require changing the grind, which is less easily accommodated in a busy café.

Size 
The size can be a single, double, or triple, using a proportional amount of ground coffee, roughly 7, 14, and 21 grams; correspondingly sized filter baskets are used. The Italian multiplier term doppio is often used for a double, with solo and triplo being more rarely used for singles and triples. The single shot is the traditional shot size, being the maximum that could easily be pulled on a lever machine.

Single baskets are sharply tapered or stepped down in diameter to provide comparable depth to the double baskets and, therefore, comparable resistance to water pressure. Most double baskets are gently tapered (the "Faema model"), while others, such as the La Marzocco, have straight sides. Triple baskets are normally straight-sided.

Portafilters will often come with two spouts, usually closely spaced, and a double-size basket – each spout can optionally dispense into a separate cup, yielding two solo-size (but doppio-brewed) shots, or into a single cup (hence the close spacing). True solo shots are rare, with a single shot in a café generally being half of a doppio shot.

In espresso-based drinks in America, particularly larger milk-based drinks, a drink with three or four shots of espresso will be called a "triple" or "quad", respectively.

Length 
The length of the shot can be ristretto (or stretto) (reduced), normale or standard (normal), or lungo (long): these may correspond to a smaller or larger drink with the same amount of ground coffee and same level of extraction or to different length of extraction. Proportions vary and the volume (and low density) of crema make volume-based comparisons difficult (precise measurement uses the mass of the drink). Typically ristretto is half the volume of normale, and lungo is double to triple the normale volume. For a double shot, (14 grams of dry coffee), a normale uses about 60 ml of water. A double ristretto, a common form associated with espresso, uses half the amount of water, about 30 ml.

Ristretto, normale, and lungo may not simply be the same shot, stopped at different times—which may result in an under-extracted shot (if run too short a time) or an over-extracted shot (if run too long a time). Rather, the grind is adjusted (finer for ristretto, coarser for lungo) so the target volume is achieved by the time extraction finishes.

The method of adding hot water produces a milder version of original flavor, while passing more water through the load of ground coffee will add other flavors to the espresso, which might be unpleasant for some people.

Nutrition

In a 100 ml (grams, 3.5 oz) reference amount, espresso has significant levels of dietary mineral magnesium, the B vitamins niacin and riboflavin, and around 212 mg of caffeine per 100 grams of liquid brewed coffee (table).

Espresso-based drinks 

In addition to being served alone, espresso is frequently blended, notably with milk – either steamed (without significant foam), wet foamed ("microfoam"), or dry foamed, and with hot water. Notable milk-based espresso drinks, in order of size, include: macchiato, cappuccino, flat white, and latte; other milk and espresso combinations include latte macchiato, cortado and galão, which are made primarily with steamed milk with little or no foam. Espresso and water combinations include Americano and long black. Other combinations include batch-brewed coffee with espresso, sometimes called "red eye" or "shot in the dark".

In order of size, these may be organized as follows:
 Traditional macchiato: 35–40 ml, one shot (30 ml) with a small amount of milk (mostly steamed, with slight foam so there is a visible mark)
 Modern macchiato: 60 ml or 120 ml, one or two shots (30 or 60 ml), with 1:1 milk
 Cortado: 60 ml, one shot with 1:1 milk, little foam
 Piccolo Latte: 90 ml, one shot with 1:2 milk, little foam
 Galão: 120 ml, one shot with 1:3 milk, little foam
 Flat white: 150 ml, one or two shots (30 or 60 ml), with 1:4 or 2:3 milk, and a small amount (usually ) microfoam. 
 Cappuccino: a very popular frothed milk and espresso drink with no generally-accepted volume standards, but usually served at 120 to 160 ml, including a single or (more commonly) double shot of espresso.
 Latte: 240–600 ml, two or more shots (60 ml), with 1:3–1:9 milk
Dirty: 200 ml, about 150 ml cold milk, one or two shot of espresso pouring over the cold milk directly. Usually served with glass.

Some common combinations may be organized graphically as follows:

Methods of preparation differ between drinks and between baristas. For macchiatos, cappuccino, flat white, and smaller lattes and Americanos, the espresso is brewed into the cup, then the milk or water is poured in. For larger drinks, where a tall glass will not fit under the brew head, the espresso is brewed into a small cup, then poured into the larger cup; for this purpose a demitasse or specialized espresso brew pitcher may be used. This "pouring into an existing glass" is a defining characteristic of the latte macchiato and classic renditions of the red eye. Alternatively, a glass with "existing" water may have espresso brewed into it – to preserve the crema – in the long black. Brewing onto milk is not generally done.

Alcoholic espresso cocktails 
 Caffè corretto
 Espresso martini

See also

 List of coffee drinks
 List of hot beverages
 
 Caffeinated drink

References

Citations

Sources

Further reading

Schomer, David C. Espresso Coffee: Professional Techniques. 1996.

External links 

 
Coffee preparation
Coffee drinks
Articles containing video clips
Hot drinks
Italian cuisine
Coffee culture
Coffee in Italy